Simian Records was a record label founded by actor Elijah Wood in 2005 and incorporated in the state of California on May 10, 2007. The label's first album, New Magnetic Wonder by The Apples in Stereo, was released on February 6, 2007. It was co-released and distributed through Yep Roc Records, Elephant 6 and Redeye Distribution.  The corporation was dissolved on August 12, 2015. The corporation identifier was C2998232, Simian Records.

In addition to The Apples in Stereo, Simian Records also signed the band Heloise and the Savoir Faire.

Roster
The Apples in Stereo
Heloise and the Savoir Faire

See also
 List of record labels

References

Record labels established in 2005
American independent record labels
Indie rock record labels